The Portsmouth Sinfonia was an English orchestra founded by a group of students at the Portsmouth School of Art in 1970. The Sinfonia was generally open to anyone and ended up drawing players who were either people without musical training or, if they were musicians, ones that chose to play an instrument that was entirely new to them. Among the founding members was one of their teachers, English composer Gavin Bryars. The orchestra started as a one-off, tongue-in-cheek performance art ensemble but became a cultural phenomenon over the following 10 years, with concerts, record albums, a film and a hit single. They last performed publicly in 1979.

History
Bryars was interested more in experimenting with the nature of music than forming a traditional orchestra. Instead of picking the most competent musicians he could find, he encouraged anyone to join, regardless of talent, ability or experience. The only rules were that everyone had to come for rehearsals and that people should try their best to get it right and not intentionally try to play badly. The first recording made by the Sinfonia was a flexi disc of Rossini's William Tell Overture, which was sent out as the invitation for the degree show that year.

The early repertoire of the Sinfonia was drawn from standard classical repertoire (such as "The Blue Danube" waltz and Also sprach Zarathustra), so that most orchestra members had a rough idea of what the piece should sound like, even if they could not play their chosen instrument accurately.  In later years, the group's repertoire would expand to popular music, including rock and roll. Many modern composers and musicians found this to be interesting and even profound; the comedic aspects of the music were merely a bonus, though it was used extensively for marketing purposes. Brian Eno was interested enough to join the orchestra, playing clarinet, and subsequently producing their first two albums.

The orchestra was invited by the composer Michael Parsons to play the Purcell Room at London's Royal Festival Hall. Their first album, Portsmouth Sinfonia Plays the Popular Classics, was released in 1974. On 28 May 1974, as their fame increased, they played a concert at the Royal Albert Hall with conductor John Farley which sold thousands of tickets. The orchestra's take on the late 1970s and early 1980s vogue for pop classical medleys, "Classical Muddly" – produced by their manager Martin Lewis and released by Springtime!/Island Records in 1981 – is characteristic of their sound; it was inspired by the Royal Philharmonic Orchestra's "Hooked on Classics". The single, which consisted of the group's previous recordings sped up, amalgamated and synchronized to a disco beat, was a top 40 hit in the UK Singles Chart. 

As the years passed, the musicians eventually became accustomed to, and more skilled at playing their instruments, which diminished the novelty of the group. Although the group never formally disbanded, it ceased performing in 1979.

A recording of the sinfonia playing the beginning of Also sprach Zarathustra has achieved some fame as an internet meme under the moniker "orchestra fail", further gaining popularity on YouTube via references from musician Devin Townsend. The recording was used as the walk-on music for Swedish band Peter Bjorn and John during their 2011 "Gimme Some" tour in the US.

The Portsmouth Sinfonia was the subject of a 2011 BBC Radio 4 documentary presented by Jolyon Jenkins in the series "In Living Memory". In the programme Gavin Bryars disputed the notion that members were required to be novices at their instruments, saying that it was a "scurrilous rumour put about by the BBC".

Michael Nyman created a similar outfit called Foster's Social Orchestra, which is heard on the soundtrack of the 1999 film Ravenous.

Discography
 Portsmouth Sinfonia Plays the Popular Classics (1974)
 Hallelujah! – The Portsmouth Sinfonia at the Royal Albert Hall (1974)
 20 Classic Rock Classics (1980)
 "Classical Muddly" / "Hallelujah Chorus" (single, Springtime Records 1981 – UK No. 38)
 Dead Parrot Society (compilation album, 1993)
 The Best/Worst of the Portsmouth Sinfonia

See also
The Really Terrible Orchestra
The Really Terrible Orchestra Of the Triangle

References

External links
 Portsmouth Sinfonia official site
 Portsmouth Sinfonia at Discogs

1970 establishments in England
1979 disestablishments in England
British instrumental musical groups
British comedy musical groups
English orchestras
Disbanded orchestras
Outsider musicians
Musicians from Portsmouth
Musical groups established in 1970
Musical groups disestablished in 1979
Organisations based in Portsmouth